Islamic Azad University, Neyshabur Branch (IAUN), also known as the Islamic Azad University of Neyshabur, is a branch campus of Islamic Azad University in Nishapur, Iran. It is one of the largest universities by size and student enrolment in the Razavi Khorasan province and the oldest modern comprehensive university in the city and the county of Neyshabur.

IAUN has 5 main faculties and it offers postgraduate (Including doctorate degrees), undergraduate and associate degrees in a vast number of fields related to humanities, business and management, engineering and technology, basic sciences, sports sciences and medical sciences.

References

External links 
www.iau-neyshabur.ac.ir
www.iau.ir

Educational institutions established in 1985
nishapur|Nishapur
Buildings and structures in Nishapur
1985 establishments in Iran
Education in Razavi Khorasan Province